Siem Reap Football Club (Khmer: ខេត្តសៀមរាប), is a football club based in Siem Reap Province, Cambodia. The club competes in the Cambodian League 2, which is the division under the Cambodian Premier League.

Current squad

References
https://cncc-football.com/hun-sen-cup.html

External links 
Hun Sen Cup

Football clubs in Cambodia